The Benedict Doll House is a private house located at 665 West Chicago Street in Coldwater, Michigan. It was listed on the National Register of Historic Places in 1990.

History
Benedict Doll moved from Toledo, Ohio to Coldwater in 1894 and purchased the brewery which was  formerly located near the site of this house. The Doll family initially lived in the brewery, but by 1899 the family had grown to six children. Profits from the brewery had also grown, and that year Doll had this house constructed. The family moved in during January 1900.

Coldwater voted to become a dry city in 1909, putting the brewery out of business. Doll turned to selling ice, and also operated a rubbish-removal service. As automotive traffic increased along the Chicago Road, Doll and his children opened a gas station, and later a restaurant near the brewery. Benedict Doll continued to live in this house until his death in 1941. His wife continued to live in the house until her death in 1955, and some of the couple's children occupied the house until it was sold out of the family in 1985.

Description
The Benedict Doll House is a -story wood frame Eastlake house with a cross-gable-and-hip roof covered with metal tiles. The house stands on a cut fieldstone foundation and is covered with clapboards below the gables, which are covered with shingling on the front and sides. The front of the house is spanned with a long porch with turned posts and spindlework. A smaller second floor porch is above the entryway.

On the interior, the front entry leads into a stair hall. A parlor is located off the hall, and a narrow corridor leads back to the kitchen. A living room is also located on the first floor; both the parlor and living room are finished with dark stained wood trim. A large modern large kitchen/family room area has been incorporated into the rear of the house. On the second floor, a hallway runs through the center of the house, and the bedrooms open to either side.

References

National Register of Historic Places in Branch County, Michigan
Queen Anne architecture in Michigan